Solifugae is an order of animals in the class Arachnida known variously as camel spiders, wind scorpions, sun spiders, or solifuges. The order includes more than 1,000 described species in about 147 genera. Despite the common names, they are neither true scorpions (order Scorpiones), nor true spiders (order Araneae). Most species of Solifugae live in dry climates and feed opportunistically on ground-dwelling arthropods and other small animals. A number of urban legends exaggerate the size and speed of the Solifugae, and their potential danger to humans, which is negligible.

Anatomy

Solifuges are moderately small to large arachnids (a few millimeters to several centimeters in body length), with the larger species reaching  in length, including legs. In practice, the respective lengths of the legs of various species differ drastically, so the resulting figures are often misleading. More practical measurements refer primarily to the body length, quoting leg lengths separately, if at all.

Like that of the spider order, the Araneae, the body plan of the Solifugae has two main tagmata: the prosoma, or cephalothorax, is the anterior tagma, and the 10-segmented abdomen, or opisthosoma, is the posterior tagma. The abdominal tergites and sternites are separated by large areas of intersegmental membranes, giving it a high degree of flexibility and ability to stretch considerably, which allows it to consume a large amount of food. As shown in the illustrations, the solifuge prosoma and opisthosoma are not separated by nearly as clear a constriction and connecting tube or "pedicel" as occurs in Araneae. The lack of the pedicel reflects another difference between the Solifugae and spiders, namely that solifuges lack both spinnerets and silk, and do not spin webs. Spiders need considerable mobility of their abdomens in their spinning activities, and the Solifugae have no such adaptation.

The prosoma comprises the head, the mouthparts, and the somites that bear the legs and the pedipalps. It is covered by a carapace, also called a prosomal dorsal shield or peltidium, which is composed of three distinct elements called propeltidium, mesopeltidium and metapeltidium. The propeltidium contains the eyes, the chelicerae that, in most species, are conspicuously large, the pedipalps and the first two pairs of legs. Meso- and metapeltidium contains the third and fourth pairs of legs. The chelicerae serve as jaws and in many species also are used for stridulation. Unlike scorpions, solifuges do not have a third tagma that forms a "tail".

Currently, neither fossil nor embryological evidence shows that arachnids ever had a separate thorax-like division, so the validity of the term cephalothorax, which means a fused cephalon, or head, and thorax, has been questioned. Also, arguments exist  against use of "abdomen", as the opisthosoma of many arachnids contains organs atypical of an abdomen, such as a heart and respiratory organs.

Like other arachnids outside the orders of scorpions and the Tetrapulmonata, the Solifugae lack book lungs, having instead a well-developed tracheal system that inhales and exhales air through a number of spiracles - one pair between the second and third pair of walking legs, two pairs on the abdomen on abdominal segments three and four, and an unpaired spiracle on the fifth abdominal segment. As embryos they also have opisthosomal protuberances resembling the pulmonary sacs found in some palpigrades.

Chelicerae

Among the most distinctive features of the Solifugae are their large chelicerae, which in many species are longer than the prosoma. Each of the two chelicerae has two articles (segments, parts connected by a joint), forming a powerful pincer, much like that of a crab; each article bears a variable number of teeth, largely depending on the species. The chelicerae of many species are surprisingly strong; they are capable of shearing hair or feathers from vertebrate prey or carrion, and of cutting through skin and thin bones such as those of small birds. Many Solifugae stridulate with their chelicerae, producing a rattling noise.

Legs and pedipalps

These elements work the same way as in most other arachnids. Although the  Solifugae appear to have five pairs of legs, only the hind four pairs are true legs. Each true leg has seven segments: coxa, trochanter, femur, patella, tibia, metatarsus, and tarsus.

The first, or anterior, of the five pairs of leg-like appendages are not "actual" legs, but pedipalps, and they have only five segments each. The pedipalps of the Solifugae function partly as sense organs similar to insects' antennae, and partly in locomotion, feeding, and fighting. In normal locomotion, they do not quite touch the ground, but are held out to detect obstacles and prey; in that attitude, they look particularly like an extra pair of legs or perhaps arms. Reflecting the great dependence of the Solifugae on their tactile senses, their anterior true legs commonly are smaller and thinner than the posterior three pairs. That smaller anterior pair acts largely in a sensory role as a supplement to the pedipalps, and in many species they accordingly lack tarsi. At the tips of their pedipalps, Solifugae bear a membranous suctorial organ, which are used for capturing prey, and also for bringing water to their mouthparts for drinking and climbing smooth surfaces.

For the most part, only the posterior three pairs of legs are used for running. On the undersides of the coxae and trochanters of the last pair of legs, the Solifugae have fan-shaped sensory organs called malleoli or racquet (or racket) organs. Sometimes, the blades of the malleoli are directed forward, sometimes not. They have been suspected to be sensory organs for the detection of vibrations in the soil, perhaps to detect threats and potential prey or mates. These structures may be chemoreceptors.

Males are usually smaller than females, with relatively longer legs. Unlike females, the males bear a pair of flagella, one on each chelicera. In the accompanying photograph of a male solifuge, one flagellum is just visible near the tip of each chelicera. The flagella, which bend back over the chelicerae, are sometimes called horns and are believed to have some sexual connection, but their function has not yet been clearly explained.

Eyes

Some species have very large central eyes. They look like simple eyes or ocelli, but are quite sophisticated. They can recognise forms, and are used in hunting and avoiding enemies. These eyes may represent the last step in the integration of the aggregate of simple ocelli into a compound eye, and of further integration of a compound eye into a simple eye. Lateral vestigial eyes can be found inserted into pits on the inner side of the cuticle. The lenses of these eyes are usually atrophied, but in some species there are both nerves and pigment cells present, and their function could be to detect motions or changes in light intensity.

Classification
The Solifugae are an order of their own, though are sometimes confused with spiders, which form a completely distinct order, the Araneae. The order comprises over 1000 described species in 146 genera assigned to these 13 families:

 Ammotrechidae Roewer, 1934
 Ceromidae Roewer, 1933
 Daesiidae Kraepelin, 1899
 Eremobatidae Kraepelin, 1901
 Galeodidae Sundevall, 1833
 Gylippidae Roewer, 1933
 Hexisopodidae Pocock, 1897
 Karschiidae Kraepelin, 1899
 Melanoblossiidae Roewer, 1933
 Mummuciidae Roewer, 1934
 Rhagodidae Pocock, 1897
 Solpugidae Leach, 1815
 †Protosolpugidae Petrunkevitch, 1953

Ecology

Although the Solifugae are considered to be endemic indicators of desert biomes, they occur widely in semidesert and scrub. Some species also live in grassland or forest habitats. The Solifugae generally inhabit warm and arid habitats, including virtually all warm deserts and scrublands in all continents except Antarctica and Australia.

Solifugae species are carnivorous or omnivorous, with most feeding on termites, darkling beetles, and other small, ground-dwelling arthropods. They are aggressive hunters and voracious opportunistic feeders, and have been recorded as feeding on snakes, small lizards, birds, and rodents. Prey is located with the pedipalps and killed and cut into pieces by the chelicerae. The prey is then liquefied, and the liquid ingested through the pharynx. Although they do not normally attack humans, their chelicerae can penetrate human skin, and painful bites have been reported.

Various other predators, such as the large slit-faced bat, scorpions, toads, and insectivores, may prey on the Solifugae.

Lifecycle
The Solifugae are typically univoltine (reproducing once a year). Reproduction can involve direct or indirect sperm transfer; when indirect, the male emits a spermatophore on the ground and then inserts it with his chelicerae in the female's genital pore. To do this, he flings the female on her back.

The female then digs a burrow, into which she lays 50 to 200 eggs; some species then guard them until they hatch. Because the female does not feed during this time, she tries to fatten herself beforehand, and a species of  has been observed to eat more than 100 flies during that time in the laboratory. The Solifugae undergo a number of stages including, egg, postembryo, 9–10 nymphal instars, and adults.

Etymology
The name Solifugae derives from Latin, and means "those that flee from the sun". The order is also known by the names Solpugida, Solpugides, Solpugae, Galeodea, and Mycetophorae. Their common names include camel spider, wind scorpion, scorpion carrier, jerrymunglum, sun scorpion, and sun spider.

Solifuges and humans

Solifuges have been recognized as distinct taxa from ancient times. In Aelian's De natura animalium, "four-jawed spiders" are credited, along with scorpions, as being responsible for the abandoning of a desert region near the Astaboras river (said to be in India, but thought to be a river in Ethiopia). Anton August Heinrich Lichtenstein theorized in 1797 that the "mice" that plagued the Philistines in the Old Testament were Solifugae. During World War I, troops  stationed in Abū Qīr, Egypt, would stage fights between captive "jerrymanders", as they referred to them, and placed bets on the outcome. Similarly, British troops stationed in Libya in World War II staged fights between solifuges and scorpions.

Urban legends
The Solifugae are the subject of many legends and exaggerations about their size, speed, behavior, appetite, and lethality. They are fast on land compared to other invertebrates, with their top speed estimated to be , close to half as fast as the fastest human sprinter.

The Solifugae apparently have neither venom glands nor any venom-delivery apparatus such as the fangs of spiders, stings of wasps, or venomous setae of caterpillars (e.g., Lonomia or Acharia species). One 1978 study is frequently quoted, in which the authors report detection of an exception in India, in that Rhagodes nigrocinctus had venom glands, and that injection of the secretion into mice was frequently fatal. However, no supporting studies have confirmed either statement, such as by independent detection of the glands as claimed, or the relevance of the observations, if correct. Even the authors of the original account admitted to having found no means of delivery of the putative venom by the animal, and the only means of administering the material to the mice was by parenteral injection. Given that many non-venoms such as saliva, blood and glandular secretions can be lethal if injected, and that no venomous function was even speculated upon in this study, there is still no evidence for even one venomous species of solifuge.

Because of their unfamiliar spider-like appearance and rapid movements, Solifugae have startled or even frightened many people. This fear was sufficient to drive a family from their home when one was allegedly discovered in a soldier's house in Colchester, England, and caused the family to blame the solifuge for the death of their pet dog. An Arizona resident developed painful lesions due to a claimed solifuge bite but could not produce a specimen for confirmation. Though they are not venomous, the powerful chelicerae of a large specimen may inflict a painful nip, but nothing medically significant.

References

Videos

 Camel Spider Feeding by Stefan F. Wirth

External links

 
 
 

 
Arachnid orders
Extant Pennsylvanian first appearances
Pennsylvanian taxonomic orders
Urban legends